Thomas Donovan may refer to:

 Paddy Donovan (Thomas Patrick Donovan, 1936–2018), New Zealand amateur boxer and rugby union player
 Thomas Donovan (musician) (born 1964), Canadian singer-songwriter
 Thomas Donovan (politician) (1869–1946), American politician, businessman, and lawyer
 T. J. Donovan (born 1974), American attorney and politician
 Thom Donovan (born 1974), American musician
 Tom Donovan (baseball) (1873–1911), Major League Baseball outfielder
 Tom Donovan (American football), American football wide receiver